Cooperative Research Centres (CRCs) are an Australian Federal Government program and are key bodies for Australian scientific research. The Cooperative Research Centres Programme was established in 1990 to enhance Australia's industrial, commercial and economic growth through the opined development of sustained, user-driven, cooperative public-private research centres that achieve high levels of outcomes in adoption and commercialisation. The program emphasises the importance of collaborative arrangements to maximise the benefits of research through an enhanced process of utilisation, commercialisation, and technology transfer. 

It also has an education component with a focus on producing graduates with skills relevant to industry needs. Most CRCs offer scholarships for postgraduate students.

The CRC programme is administered by the Commonwealth Department of Industry and Science. Reviews of the CRC programme have been regularly undertaken. In 2012, an independent impact study found that from 1991 to 2017 CRCs generated a net economic benefit of $7.5 billion. This equates to an annual contribution of $278 million, or around 0.03 percentage points to GDP.

The Cooperative Research Centre Association (CRCA) was established on 1 December 1994 to promote the CRC program while also acting as a conduit for information sharing and learning between CRCs. Over time the role has evolved to the extent that today the CRCA is recognised as the principal non-Government advocate of the CRC Program.

History
Since the commencement of the CRC Programme in 1991, there have been 14 selection rounds. Selection rounds were conducted in March 1991, December 1991, December 1992, December 1994, and then at regular two-year intervals: 1996 through 2006. Following the review of the Programme in 2008, the 11th and 12th selection rounds were both held in 2009. Selection rounds are now annual. A number of websites of the previously funded CRCs are archived in perpetuity on the National Library of Australia's Trove online library database aggregator.

Retired programs

SERC

The Cooperative Research Centre (CRC) for Space Environment Management was administered by the Space Environment Research Centre (SERC).  Based on Mount Stromlo, Australia, SERC operated from 2014 to 2021 and conducted research into practical global efforts for space debris management, mitigation and removal.  SERC Participants included EOS Space Systems, Lockheed Martin, Optus Satellite, Australian National University, RMIT University and NICT (Japan).

Bushfire CRC

The Bushfire Cooperative Research Centre was an Australian-based organisation which conducted research into the social, environmental, and economic impact of bushfires. Although the CRC has completed operations, a legacy of a decade of research content is still online and accessible. Funded originally by a grant from the Australian government's Cooperative Research Centre in 2003, the Bushfire CRC was funded to 2014 to address key issues raised by recent major fires.  The Bushfire CRC was made up of all the fire and land management agencies in Australia and New Zealand, CSIRO, the Bureau of Meteorology, the Attorney General's Department and several other fire related organisations. A small executive office was maintained in East Melbourne. The organisation participated in the Cooperative Research Centres Association (CRCA). The work of Bushfire research was carried forward within the expanded research portfolio of the Bushfire and Natural Hazards CRC, from 2013 to 2021, and now with Natural Hazards Research Australia.

CSSIP

The Cooperative Research Centre for Sensor Signal and Information Processing (or CSSIP) was an organisation established under the Cooperative Research Centres program. It operated from 1992 to 2006, performing research, development, and education within several Information and Communications Technology areas: CSSIP's education arm was assigned to NICTA in mid-2005.

Spatial information

The CRC for Spatial Information (CRCSI) was a research organisation funded by Australia's Cooperative Research Centre Programme (CRC) and by participant contributions. The CRCSI was founded in 2003 with the successful re-bid announced in August 2009. The programme ended in June 2018. The CRCSI conducted research and development projects that involved collaboration between government, corporate, and academic resources.  The CRCSI ensured Australia and New Zealand remained relevant in a spatially-connected world.  The CRCSI was responsible for innovative research; the application and commercialisation of spatial information technologies by building collaborative partnerships. A study commissioned by the CRCSI and ANZLIC in 2008 found that the spatial information industry contributed between $6.4 and $12.6 billion to Australia's GDP in 2006-2007 alone. CRCSI has offices in Melbourne, Canberra, Sydney, Brisbane, Perth and Wellington in New Zealand. The CRCSI research delved into key industry sectors, including: agriculture, natural resources and climate change; defence; built environment; and health through the delivery of spatial information across positioning, rapid spatial analytics and spatial infrastructures.

See also 
 CSIRO – Commonwealth Scientific and Industrial Research Organisation
 Lowitja Institute

Notes and references

External links
 

Research institutes in Australia